Kang Eun-tak (born Shin Seul-gi on August 16, 1982) is a South Korean actor. He is best known for his leading roles in the television series Land of Gold (2014), Apgujeong Midnight Sun (2014–2015), and Bubbly Lovely (2016–2017).

Personal life
In November 2018, it was confirmed by their respective agencies that Kang and his Love to the End co-star Lee Young-ah have been dating since October 2018. In April 2019, it was confirmed by their respective agencies that Kang and Lee Young-ah had ended their relationship earlier that year.

Filmography

Television series

Film

Music video

Awards and nominations

References

External links
Kang Eun-tak's blog at Naver 

1986 births
Living people
South Korean male television actors
South Korean male film actors
Seoul Institute of the Arts alumni